{{Infobox comics character 
|image=King shark.jpg
|caption=Textless cover of Aquaman: Sword of Atlantis #47 (January 2007).Art by Jackson Guice and Daniel Brown.
|character_name=King Shark|species = Demigod
|homeworld = Hawaii, New Earth
|real_name=Nanaue
|publisher=DC Comics
|debut=Cameo appearance: Superboy (vol. 4) #0 (October 1994)Full appearance: Superboy (vol. 4) #9 (November 1994)
|creators=Karl KeselTom Grummett
|alliances=Suicide SquadSecret Society of Super VillainsSecret Six
|aliases= Trixie
|powers=
 Superhuman strength, stamina, durability, speed, and senses
 Sharp teeth and claws
 Regeneration
 Underwater breathing
 Animal empathy
}}King Shark is a supervillain appearing in comic books published by DC Comics. The character, also known as Nanaue, was created by writer Karl Kesel and artist Tom Grummett. King Shark's first key appearance was in Superboy #0 (October 1994) as a cameo before making his first full appearance in Superboy #9 (November 1994). The character serves as an adversary to Aquaman, The Flash, and Superboy.

The character has been adapted from the comics into various forms of media, including television series, feature films, and video games. King Shark made his live-action debut in the television series The Flash, voiced by David Hayter while Dan Payne portrayed his human form. In the DC Extended Universe, King Shark was voiced by actor Sylvester Stallone and motion captured by Steve Agee in the film The Suicide Squad (2021).

Fictional character biography
Born in Hawaii, Nanaue is a humanoid shark. His father is "The King of All Sharks"—also known as the Shark God. Originally there were some doubts surrounding his origins, as other characters, such as special agent Sam Makoa, dismissed his origins as superstition and referred to him as a "savage mutation" and it was also implied that he was one of the "Wild Men", evolved animals based on those in Kamandi: The Last Boy on Earth, but the now-ended Aquaman: Sword of Atlantis series put an end to the controversy by firmly establishing him as the Shark God's son.

King Shark was responsible for a number of missing persons several years before Superboy arrived in Hawaii. Sam Makoa was responsible for bringing him in and bore the scars to prove it. King Shark is freed by the Silicon Dragons, who plan on hiring him. Nanaue is not interested, and kills his liberators before heading to his mother's house. His mother allows him to bite her right arm off to feed. Superboy managed to take him down with his heat vision. When Superboy and Makoa were assigned to the Suicide Squad to destroy the Dragons, Nanaue was forced to help. An explosive belt was strapped to his waist, set to detonate if anything happened to Makoa. Other members of the Squad included Knockout and Squad veterans Deadshot and Captain Boomerang.

Nanaue was a crazed fighting machine, shredding legions of the Dragons (and killing Sidearm too, when he betrays the team). Despite the belt detonating, King Shark survived the blast and the destruction of the lair.

After a research team sent to investigate the lair's remains went missing, King Shark was initially suspected, but it turned out to be Black Manta. King Shark fought Superboy, but he was defeated and driven out to sea. 

King Shark later turned up in the Wild Lands and fought Superboy and his allies. After a fierce battle, he was assumed killed, but no body was ever recovered.

He joined Manchester Black's Legion of Villains in the "Ending Battle". He later turned up in Metropolis and attacked Jimmy Olsen. Superman quickly took him down, knocking most of his teeth out (though they grew back). In all of his previous appearances he rarely spoke, but during this issue he was very verbose (although that may be because of Black's influence). He also was smaller and a long way from the water.

King Shark also made an appearance during the Joker's Last Laugh riot with Orca.

King Shark is recruited into Alexander Luthor's Secret Society of Super Villains and is one of the many sent to attack Sub Diego. During the battle he kills Neptune Perkins.

Nanaue reappears one year after the Infinite Crisis, bearing a scar from a previous encounter with Aquaman. He is less violent and more talkative than in previous appearances. His origin has been definitely given as him being the son of the Shark God, due to the new Aquaman book being more magic-based than previous incarnations. He is a major character in the series, acting as an unwilling caretaker for Arthur Joseph Curry. Saved from a gang of marauders by the young man, he brought Curry to the mysterious Dweller in the Depths (the mutated, for unknown reasons, Aquaman) who gave him the role of assisting the new Aquaman in filling his role. Albeit feigning disrespect, and often disappearing for a while, King Shark accepted, sharing his knowledge of the way of sea with his young savior. It is later revealed in a flashback sequence that he was asked to do so by his father: 
The currents of destiny bend and twist around that young man. For good or ill, he will shape the coming oceanscape. You will protect him. You will be my agent in his camp. Close enough to guard against others who seek to control him. And close enough, when I decide the time is ripe... ... to strike, and kill him without warning.

The following arc tells the first meeting between the original Aquaman and King Shark, which occurred several years ago. It took place in Reef's End, a little border town in the Coral Sea, distant from Atlantis. Orin — who was still the King of Atlantis at this time — fought King Shark because he murdered a priest of the Order of the Thorny Crown. King Shark had previously killed a number of members of this group, obeying his father's will. The Order was associated with an old prophecy:

When thorned crown lies shattered, she comes. Born of coral, of life-in-death, of long prayer. Shake the sea floor with her power, shall she, shake the destiny of all beneath the waves...

The Shark God believed that if the Order was destroyed, that would trigger the prophecy, birthing some great power in the process. However, King Shark was defeated by Aquaman before completing his father's goal. He then was imprisoned by priests of the Thorny Crown for three years before escaping; Nanaue mentions that he was tortured during his captivity.

Following the Final Crisis, King Shark's jaw is broken after being cleaved wide open and later his left arm is ripped off his body during battle, but later grew back.

King Shark is among Superboy's villains brought by Krypto to a hill near the Smallville high school. However, he is either unconscious or stunned at the time.

Most recently, he has joined the Secret Six as a brawler. His tenure with the Six proves to be short-lived, as the team is soon captured by a large group of superheroes during a failed mission in Gotham City. King Shark manages to briefly overpower his old foe Superboy during the battle, but is ultimately pummeled into unconsciousness by Supergirl.

The New 52 - present

In September 2011, DC Comics rebooted its fictional continuity in an initiative called The New 52. In this new timeline, King Shark now resembles a humanoid hammerhead shark. He was tortured and forced into the Suicide Squad by Amanda Waller. When he came to the Suicide Squad having to comply with Amanda Waller's demands, King Shark ended up eating his teammate Yo-Yo (it is later revealed that Yo-Yo survived). During the 2013 "Forever Evil" storyline, King Shark is among the villains that the Crime Syndicate recruited to join the Secret Society of Super Villains.

In the continuity resulting from the 2016 DC Rebirth initiative, King Shark began serving N.E.M.O under Black Manta. He began terrorizing San Francisco before being subdued by the Teen Titans. He also appears as one of the many villains attempting to kill Batman to halt Two-Face's data breach, attacking Batman on a train alongside Amygdala and Killer Croc. After leaving the organization, King Shark attempted to live a more peaceful life, only to be captured by the Markovian military under allegations of cannibalizing a Markovian general. Wonder Woman soon arrived, doubting that he committed the crime, and used the Lasso of Truth on him to prove his innocence. She them left him in the hands of Aquaman, hoping to start anew in Atlantis.

Following Aquaman's usurpation of the throne, King Shark returns as a crime lord of the Ninth Tride with plans to expand his empire to more regions of Atlantis. He has his minions capture Mera to use as a bargaining chip and has a run-in with the still alive Aquaman. He convinces King Shark to work with him at stopping King Rath's murderous ambitions on the condition that the Ninth Tride would receive better treatment by the new monarch. As a show of good faith, King Shark gives Mera back to Arthur. With their combined forces, they were able to free Atlantis from the Crown of Thorns.

Powers and abilities
King Shark's augmented flesh provides protection against underwater pressures and physical attacks. His shark-like physiology includes natural weapons, as well as gills that allows him to breathe in the water. He can swim at great speeds, regrow lost bodily tissues, or withstand cold temperatures. King Shark has enhanced strength, stamina, and senses. King Shark was able to sense or call out his shark "cousins" for assistance, although he cannot actually control them, especially when they are filled with blood frenzy. His mystical nature means that his bite could even pierce the skin of Kryptonians.

Other versions
"Flashpoint"
In the alternate timeline of the 2011 "Flashpoint" storyline King Shark works as a strongman freak show in the Haley's Circus. Haley's Circus is attacked by Amazons, and King Shark is killed while trying to save Doctor Fate.

In other media
Television

 King Shark appears in The Flash, portrayed by Dan Payne as a human and voiced by David Hayter as King Shark. This version is originally Shay Lamden, a marine biologist from Earth-2 who was transformed by Harry Wells' S.T.A.R. Labs particle accelerator into an anthropomorphic great white shark, and fell under Zoom's control while his Earth-1 counterpart died when his S.T.A.R. Labs' accelerator exploded. 
 King Shark appears as a main character in Harley Quinn, voiced by Ron Funches. This version is a kind and peaceful tech genius who wears clothes and is shown to have a generally positive attitude. However, he occasionally goes berserk if he smells blood, and becomes angry when anyone uses fish-related insults around him.
 King Shark appears in Young Justice: Phantoms, voiced by James Arnold Taylor. This version, also known as King Nanaue Sha'ark, is the ruler of the Atlantean city state of Nanauve and a former student of the Atlantean Conservatory of Sorcery.

Film

 King Shark makes a non-speaking minor appearance in Superman/Batman: Public Enemies.
 King Shark appears in Batman: Assault on Arkham, voiced by John DiMaggio. This version is a large human with mutated features, a metal mask that augments his biting capability, and a red mohawk in place of a dorsal fin. He is recruited by Amanda Waller to become a member of the Suicide Squad, who are tasked with killing the Riddler. During the mission, King Shark forms a friendship with Killer Frost and is killed by a bomb Waller implanted into the squad members' necks to control them.
 King Shark appears in Justice League Dark: Apokolips War, voiced again by John DiMaggio. This version is a member of the Suicide Squad and John Constantine's ex-boyfriend. King Shark and his team assist the Justice League in an attempt to defeat Darkseid before the squad is killed in an explosion.
 King Shark appears in The Suicide Squad, voiced by Sylvester Stallone, with Steve Agee providing on-set motion-capture performance during filming. This version displays a childlike demeanor and speaks in a monosyllabic manner with simple sentences. After being recruited into the Suicide Squad to infiltrate and destroy a Corto Maltese prison containing Starro, King Shark forms a friendship with teammate Ratcatcher 2.

Video games
 King Shark appears as a playable character in Lego Batman 3: Beyond Gotham, voiced by Travis Willingham. He is part of the DLC "The Squad". This version resembles his New 52 counterpart.
 King Shark appears as an unlockable playable character in Lego DC Super-Villains, voiced by Fred Tatasciore.
 King Shark appears in DC Universe Online, voiced by Dale Dudley.
 King Shark will appear as a playable character in Suicide Squad: Kill the Justice League, voiced by Samoa Joe.

Miscellaneous
 King Shark's son Kid Shark' appears in the Batman: Arkham Knight prequel comic.
 The Young Justice incarnation of King Shark appears in the series' self-titled tie-in comic book.
 The Flashs Earth-1 incarnation of Shay Lamden / King Shark appears in The Flash: Season Zero. He accepts Dr. Shults' offer to undergo an experimental procedure employing shark cells to regenerate his dying body's cells, but is exposed to dark matter during the explosion of S.T.A.R. Labs' particle accelerator, which transforms him into an anthropomorphic shark. Developing a vendetta against those involved in the procedure, Lamden comes into conflict with the Flash and the Suicide Squad.
 King Shark appears in DC Super Hero Girls'', voiced by Kevin Michael Richardson.

References

External links
King Shark at Comic Vine

Suicide Squad members
Characters created by Karl Kesel
Comics characters introduced in 1994
DC Comics characters who can move at superhuman speeds
DC Comics characters with accelerated healing
DC Comics characters with superhuman senses
DC Comics characters with superhuman strength
DC Comics deities
DC Comics male supervillains
DC Comics metahumans
DC Comics supervillains 
DC Comics hybrids 
DC Comics animals
Anthropomorphic fish
Fictional cannibals
Fictional characters from Hawaii
Fictional characters with slowed ageing
Fictional characters with superhuman durability or invulnerability
Fictional demigods
Fictional empaths
Fictional humanoids
Fictional human–animal hybrids
Fictional kings
Fictional sharks

de:Superboy#King Shark